is a private junior college in Kawachinagano, Osaka, Japan. It was established in 1965 and adopted the present name in the following year.

Alumni 
Misaki Ito, actress

External links
 Official website

Educational institutions established in 1965
Private universities and colleges in Japan
Universities and colleges in Osaka Prefecture
Japanese junior colleges
1965 establishments in Japan
Kawachinagano